Albert Mouton was the third Captain of the Rehoboth Baster in South West Africa from 1924 to 1925.

Mouton succeeded Cornelius van Wyk on April 26, 1924. Mouton's tenure as captain was short-lived, having been overthrown on 5 April 1925, after the South African invasion of the Rehoboth area. As a result of the Baster Rebellion of 1925, the office of the Baster Captain was abolished and the special rights and de facto independence of the area revoked.

It was not until 1977 that the fourth Captain of the Baster, Ben Africa, was elected.

See also
Rehoboth Uprising

References 

Namibian chiefs
Rehoboth, Namibia
20th-century Namibian politicians
Year of birth missing
Year of death missing